It's Just a Matter of Time is the forty-second album by American singer/guitarist Glen Campbell, released in 1985 (see 1985 in music).

Track listing
Side 1:

 "It's Just a Matter of Time" (Clyde Otis, Brook Benton, Belford Hendricks) – 2:27
 "Wild Winds" (Dave Hanner) – 3:25
 "Cowboy Hall of Fame" (Jimmy Webb) – 2:33
 "Rag Doll" (Steve Eaton) – 4:00   
 "Call Home" (Mike Reid, Troy Seals) – 3:26
 
Side 2:
 
 "Do What You Gotta Do" (Webb) – 3:44
 "Cowpoke" (Stan Jones) – 2:45
 "Shattered" (Webb) – 3:30
 "Sweet Sixteen" (Arranged by Glen Campbell) – 3:45
 "Gene Autry, My Hero" (Marty Robbins) – 3:12

Personnel
Glen Campbell – vocals, acoustic guitars and electric guitars
David Briggs – keyboards
Shane Keister – synthesizer
Eddie Bayers – drums
Steve Turner – drums
Larry Paxton – bass guitar
Buddy Emmons – steel guitar
Kenneth Bell – acoustic guitar
Gregg Galbraith – acoustic guitar
Brent Rowan – electric guitar
The "A" Strings, Nashville String Machine – strings

Production
Harold Shedd – production
Jim Cotton – engineering
Joe Scaife – engineering
Aaron Rapoport – photography 
Bergen White – string arrangements ("It's Just a Matter of Time", "Wild Winds", "Call Home" and "Cowpoke")
 Jimmy Webb – string arrangements ("Cowboy Hall of Fame", "Rag Doll", "Do What You Gotta Do", "Shattered" and "Sweet Sixteen")
Al De Lory – conducting ("Cowboy Hall of Fame")

Chart performance

Album

Singles

References

Glen Campbell albums
1985 albums
Atlantic Records albums
Albums produced by Harold Shedd